Darkness and Light may refer to:

Darkness and light, or black-and-white dualism, a metaphorical expression of good and evil
Darkness and Light (film), a 1999 Taiwanese film by Chang Tso-chi
Darkness and Light (novel), a 1989 Dragonlance novel by Paul B. Thompson and Tonya R. Carter
Darkness and the Light, a 1942 novel by Olaf Stapledon
Darkness and Light (John Legend album), 2016
Darkness and Light (Keldian album), 2017
"The Darkness and the Light" (The Flash), a television episode
"The Darkness and the Light" (Star Trek: Deep Space Nine), a television episode

See also
Darkness → Light, a 2002 album by Elevator, a band that included Rick White
Darkness of the Light, a 2007 Hidden Earth novel by Peter David
Dark and Light (disambiguation)
Light and Darkness (disambiguation)